Giles Fletcher (also known as Giles Fletcher, The Younger; 1586? – 1623 in Alderton, Suffolk) was an English cleric and poet chiefly known for his long allegorical poem Christ's Victory and Triumph (1610).

Life
Fletcher was the younger son of Giles Fletcher the Elder (Ambassador to Russia of  Elizabeth I and brother to Bishop Richard Fletcher of London, chaplain to Queen Elizabeth I), and the brother of the poet Phineas Fletcher, and cousin of the dramatist John Fletcher. Educated at Westminster School and Trinity College, Cambridge, he remained in Cambridge after his ordination, becoming Reader in Greek Grammar in 1615 and Reader in Greek Language in 1618. In 1619 left to become rector of Alderton in Suffolk. Fletcher enjoyed the patronage of the Puritan philanthropist Anne Townshend at or before 1623.

His principal work has the full title Christ's Victorie and Triumph, in Heaven, in Earth, over and after Death, and consists of four cantos. The first canto, Christ's Victory in Heaven, represents a dispute in heaven between justice and mercy, using the facts of Christ's life on earth; the second, Christ's Victory on Earth, deals with an allegorical account of Christ's Temptation; the third, Christ's Triumph over Death, covers the Passion; and the fourth, Christ's Triumph after Death, covering the Resurrection and Ascension, ends with an affectionate eulogy of his brother Phineas as Thyrsilis. The meter is an eight-line stanza in the style of Spenser; the first five lines have the rhyme scheme ABABB, and the stanza concludes with a rhyming triplet. Milton borrowed liberally from Christ's Victory and Triumph in Paradise Regained.

References

External links 
 Christ's victory and triumph in heaven and earth, over and after death 1899 reprint

1580s births
1623 deaths
Alumni of Trinity College, Cambridge
17th-century English poets
17th-century English male writers
17th-century English writers
People educated at Westminster School, London
People from Suffolk Coastal (district)
16th-century English poets
English male poets